Robert Burrowes may refer to:

 Robert Burrowes (Australian politician) (1822–1885)
 Robert Burrowes (Irish politician) (1810–1881)
 Robert Burrowes (priest) (died 1841), Anglican priest in Ireland

See also 
 Robert Burrows (cricketer) (1871–1943), English cricketer
 Robert Burrows (politician) (1884–1964), British businessman and politician
 Bob Burrow (1934–2019), American basketball player